Gillian Wigmore (born 1976) is a Canadian poet and fiction writer from Vanderhoof, British Columbia. Her poetry fits within the genre of ecopoetry.

Biography 
Wigmore graduated from the University of Victoria in 1999 with a double major in Writing and in English. 

Wigmore published her first chapbook, home when it moves you in 2005, followed by her first book of poetry, Soft Geography in 2007. In 2014, her first fiction, Grayling (a novella), was published by Mother Tongue. The novella follows a couple as they descend the Dease River in northwestern BC. Her first full-length fictional work, Glory, was released in 2017. Some of her work is published in Geist and other publications.

She resides in Prince George, British Columbia.

Awards and honors
Wigmore was a finalist for the 2008 Dorothy Livesay Poetry Prize and won the 2008 ReLit Poetry Award.

Her short story collection Night Watch: The Vet Suite was named a runner-up for the Danuta Gleed Literary Award in 2022.

Works 
 home When it moves you (2005)
 Soft Geography (2007)
 Glory (2017)
 Night Watch: The Vet Suite (2021)

References 

1976 births
Living people
21st-century Canadian poets
Canadian women poets
People from Prince George, British Columbia
21st-century Canadian women writers
21st-century Canadian novelists
Canadian women novelists